Alex Beecroft is an English author best known for historical and contemporary romantic fiction featuring gay characters. They also write science fiction/fantasy fiction as Alex Oliver, and cozy mysteries under the pseudonym Robyn Beecroft. 

Beecroft won Linden Bay Romance's (now Samhain Publishing) Starlight Writing Competition in 2007 with their first novel, Captain’s Surrender, making it their first published book. On the subject of writing gay romance, Beecroft has appeared in the Charleston City Paper, LA Weekly, the New Haven Advocate, the Baltimore City Paper, and The Other Paper. They are a regular reviewer for the blog Speak Its Name, which highlights historical gay fiction.

Biography
Beecroft was born in Northern Ireland and grew up in the Peak District. They now live near Cambridge.

Beecroft identifies as agender and uses they/them pronouns.

Bibliography

Standalone Novels 
 Captain’s Surrender (2008/2010)
 The Witch's Boy (2008/2011)
 False Colors (2009)
 Shining in the Sun (2011)
 Too Many Faerie Princes (2013)
 The Reluctant Berserker (2014)
 Foxglove Corpse (2017)
 Contraband Hearts (2018)

Series

Arising
 Sons of Devils (2017)
 Angels of Istanbul (2017)

Cygnus Five
 Lioness of Cygnus Five (2016)
 Heart of Cygnus Five (2017)
 Pride of Cygnus Five (2018)

Trowchester Blues
 Trowchester Blues (2015)
 Blue Eyed Stranger (2015)
 Blue Steel Chain (2015)
 Seeing Red (2019)

Under the Hill
 Bomber's Moon (2012)
 Dogfighters (2012)

The Unquiet Spirits
 Buried With Him (2016) prequel novella
 The Wages of Sin (2010)
 Waters of the Deep (2017)

Novellas
 Blessed Isle, anthology: Hidden Conflict: Tales from Lost Voices in Battle (2009)
 The Wages of Sin, anthology: The Mysterious (2010)
 By Honor Betrayed (2011)
 His Heart's Obsession (2012)
 The Crimson Outlaw (2013)
 Labyrinth (2016)

Short Stories
 Insubordination (2008)
 Desire and Disguise, anthology: I Do (2009)
 Inner Truth, anthology: I Do Two (2010)
 All At Sea (a short story anthology) (2013)

References

External links
 Alex Beecroft homepage
 Charleston City Paper article
 LA Weekly article
 New Haven Advocate article
 Baltimore City Paper article
 The Other Paper article

English romantic fiction writers
Living people
Year of birth missing (living people)
Agender people